Jamil Demby (born June 20, 1996) is an American football offensive guard for the Vegas Vipers of the XFL. He played college football at Maine.

Early years
A native of Vineland, New Jersey, Demby attended Vineland High School. Demby is of mixed ethnicity with a Latina mother and an African American father. play four years for the Umaine Blackbears.

College career
Demby played college football for the University of Maine, appearing in 42 games with the team. As a senior he led the offensive line to allowing the fewest sacks in the Colonial Athletic Association with 19. He was named to the first-team all-CAA, the all-New England Football team, the FCS All-America first-team and the STATS FCS All-America second-team. Demby graduated with a degree in kinesiology in May 2018.

Professional career

Los Angeles Rams
Demby was drafted by the Los Angeles Rams in the sixth round, 192nd overall, of the 2018 NFL Draft, through a pick acquired from the Dallas Cowboys in a trade for Tavon Austin. He was waived by the Rams on September 8, 2018.

Detroit Lions
On September 11, 2018, Demby was claimed off waivers by the Detroit Lions. He was waived on September 18, 2018, and was re-signed to the practice squad.

Los Angeles Rams (second stint)
On December 12, 2018, the Rams signed Demby off the Lions' practice squad. He was waived on September 4, 2020, and re-signed to the practice squad. He was elevated to the active roster on December 26 for the team's week 16 game against the Seattle Seahawks, and reverted to the practice squad after the game. On January 18, 2021, Demby signed a reserve/futures contract with the Rams. He was waived/injured on August 4, 2021, and placed on injured reserve. In 2021, Demby won Super Bowl LVI when the Rams defeated the Cincinnati Bengals 23-20.

Personal life 
Demby is left handed.

References

External links
Maine Black Bears bio

1996 births
Living people
People from Vineland, New Jersey
Vineland High School alumni
Players of American football from New Jersey
Sportspeople from Cumberland County, New Jersey
American football offensive tackles
Maine Black Bears football players
Los Angeles Rams players
Detroit Lions players
Vegas Vipers players